Piampatara is a genus of longhorn beetles of the subfamily Lamiinae, containing the following species:

 Piampatara humeralis (Aurivillius, 1916)
 Piampatara ocreata (Bates, 1885)
 Piampatara proseni Martins & Galileo, 1997
 Piampatara ubirajarai (Lane, 1966)

References

Hemilophini